Mike Feigenspan (born 5 August 1995) is a German professional footballer who plays as a winger for Kickers Offenbach.

Career
On 11 January 2019, Feigenspan joined 3. Liga club Eintracht Braunschweig, signing a 1.5-year contract until 30 June 2020 with the option of another season. He made his debut for Braunschweig in the 3. Liga on 27 January 2019, coming on as a substitute in the 74th minute for Leandro Putaro in the home match against Hansa Rostock. Feigenspan scored Braunschweig's second goal of the match with a header in the 88th minute via an assist from Marcel Bär, securing the 2–0 win for the club.

On 31 January 2023, Feigenspan signed with Kickers Offenbach.

References

External links
 
 
 OSC Vellmar statistics at Fussball.de
 OSC Vellmar II statistics at Fussball.de
 Hessen Kassel II statistics at Fussball.de

1995 births
Living people
Sportspeople from Kassel
Footballers from Hesse
German footballers
Association football wingers
KSV Hessen Kassel players
Borussia Mönchengladbach II players
Eintracht Braunschweig players
KFC Uerdingen 05 players
SV Meppen players
Kickers Offenbach players
3. Liga players
Regionalliga players